Juan Carlos Rodríguez Ibarra (Mérida, Spain 19 January 1948) is a Spanish politician of the Spanish Socialist Workers' Party (PSOE). He was President of the Regional Government of Extremadura for 24 years (1983–2007).

Biography
He gained a degree in philosophy from the University of Seville. In 1977 he was elected to the Spanish Congress of Deputies representing Badajoz region serving until 1983 when he resigned to become President of the autonomous community of Extremadura. He has also been deputy of the Assembly for Badajoz, General Secretary of PSOE of Extremadura, Executive Secretary of the Executive Federal Commission of the PSOE and teacher in commission of services for political matters of the Department of Hispanic Philology of the University of Extremadura in the Department of Education of Badajoz.

The University of Córdoba in Argentina granted him an honorary doctorate on 16 September 2003.

He is married to Leonor Godoy and has a daughter.

At the end of his term of office he was very criticised because of his support to the Balboa oil-refinery, property of his close friend Alfonso Gallardo, one of the most known businessman in the region.

External links
Biography at Spanish Congress site

1948 births
Living people
Presidents of the Regional Government of Extremadura
People from Mérida, Spain
Members of the constituent Congress of Deputies (Spain)
Members of the 1st Congress of Deputies (Spain)
Members of the 2nd Congress of Deputies (Spain)
Spanish Socialist Workers' Party politicians
Members of the 1st Assembly of Extremadura
Members of the 2nd Assembly of Extremadura
Members of the 3rd Assembly of Extremadura
Members of the 4th Assembly of Extremadura
Members of the 5th Assembly of Extremadura
Members of the 6th Assembly of Extremadura